Bouteilles-Saint-Sébastien is a commune in the Dordogne department in southwestern France.

Geography
The Lizonne forms the commune's southwestern border.

Population

See also
Communes of the Dordogne département

References

Communes of Dordogne